Artiman (also Romanized as Ārtīmān; also known as Ārtmān) is a village in Hayaquq-e Nabi Rural District, in the Central District of Tuyserkan County, Hamadan Province, Iran. At the 2006 census, its population was 2,655, in 694 families.

References 

Populated places in Tuyserkan County